This is a list of Estonian television related events from 2016.

Events
21 February - Eesti otsib superstaari season 6 winner Jüri Pootsmann is selected to represent Estonia at the 2016 Eurovision Song Contest with his song "Play". He is selected to be the twenty-second Estonian Eurovision entry during Eesti Laul held at the Saku Suurhall in Tallinn.

Debuts

Television shows

1990s
Õnne 13 (1993–present)

2000s
Eesti otsib superstaari (2007–present)

Ending this year

Births

Deaths

See also
2016 in Estonia